Mrisho Mashaka Gambo (born in Arusha) is a Tanzanian CCM politician and Member of Parliament presently serves Arusha Urban Constituency since November 2020. He was also a District Commissioner and Regional Commissioner for the Arusha Region replaced by Iddi Kimanta.

References

External links
Mrisho Gambo Instagram

Living people
Chama Cha Mapinduzi politicians
Chama Cha Mapinduzi MPs
Tanzanian MPs 2020–2025
People from Arusha Region
Tanzanian civil servants
Year of birth missing (living people)